KBFX (100.5 MHz) is a commercial classic rock music FM radio station in Anchorage, Alaska.  It is owned by iHeartMedia, Inc.  Its studios are located at Dimond Center in Anchorage, and its transmitter is located atop the Denali Tower North south of downtown.

History
The station began in 1978 as KHVN, playing a religious format.  It underwent several changes in both format and callsigns throughout the late 1970s and 1980s.

KBFX debuted in 1989 as "100.5 The Fox", playing the strict version of Jacobs Media's classic rock format.

Programming was initially run by Dave Moore, who had studied the format with Fred Jacobs at its inception. Staff included afternoon deejay CC Ryder (who won a small market Marconi Award for her work), evening deejay T-bone, and former WNCX Cleveland deejay Rick Rydell (hired in 1990).

Moore was replaced by Jack Hicks from KQRS-FM Minneapolis, then three months later Hicks returned to Minnesota and was replaced by local broadcaster Devan Mitchell.

During Mitchell's watch, a competitor in the same format ("Arrow 102") came on the air for the first time since 1989.

References

External links

1978 establishments in Alaska
Classic rock radio stations in the United States
IHeartMedia radio stations
Radio stations established in 1978
BFX